Victor Arnold Washington (March 23, 1946 – December 31, 2008) was an American professional football player who was a running back and kick returner in the Canadian Football League (CFL) and National Football League (NFL). After attending the University of Wyoming, he played nine professional seasons, three in the CFL and six in the NFL.

Early Life

Washington, who never knew his father, was born to 16-year old Marion Washington in Plainfield, New Jersey in 1946.  She was often unable to support him, and he spent much of his childhood being raised by his grandmother, as well as some time in an orphanage.

He played baseball, track, and football at Plainfield High School (New Jersey), where his football talent earned him a scholarship to Wyoming.

College career

Washington played for Wyoming from 1965 to 1967, as a running back, defensive back, and kick returner.  As a sophomore, he intercepted three passes and returned 34 punts for 443 yards.  In his Junior season, Washington set school records for punt return yards in a season (53 for 565 yards and 2 touchdowns) and in a single game (145 yards).  He also had a 95-yard kickoff return touchdown, 40 tackles, 22 pass deflections, and four interceptions.  With a team that featured Washington and star running back Jim Kiick, Wyoming finished the season undefeated at 10-0 before losing to Louisiana State University in the Sugar Bowl, 28–13.

The Sugar Bowl loss turned out to be Washington's final college game.  A few months later, Washington was charged with assaulting a 19-year-old student referee during an intermural basketball game.  He pleaded guilty and received 5-day suspended jail sentence and a 25-dollar fine.  Wyoming permanently expelled him.  Despite this, Wyoming still voted him into their athletic hall of fame in 2005.

CFL
Vic Washington first starred with the CFL's Ottawa Rough Riders in 1968 and 1969, winners of back-to-back Grey Cup Championships in 1968 & 1969 against the Calgary Stampeders and the Saskatchewan Roughriders, respectively.  He shared the backfield with future NFL running back Bo Scott. In the first of the two title matches, Washington received the Most Valuable Player award for his 80-yard touchdown run from scrimmage, establishing a Grey Cup record that still stands. He played one more season in the CFL with the 1970 B.C.Lions before leaving for the NFL.

NFL
After signing with the NFL's San Francisco 49ers, he rushed for 811 yards with a 4.2 average, led the league with 1,986 all-purpose yards, was named to his only Pro Bowl and helped to lead the team to the National Football Conference finals in 1971. In a 49ers loss to the Dallas Cowboys in the playoffs the next season, he returned the opening kickoff 97 yards for a touchdown setting the NFL postseason record for longest kickoff return. He finished his professional football career with the Houston Oilers and Buffalo Bills. Washington retired with 129 kickoff returns for 3,341 yards and a touchdown, while also rushing for 2,028 yards and 16 touchdowns, and catching 130 passes for 1,090 yards and 5 scores.

Post NFL

Washington struggled heavily after his playing career was over, due to lingering injuries and a drug addiction, which led to the breakup of his marriage and a brief period of homelessness.  In 1983 he filed for disability benefits with the NFL, citing a degenerative bone disease and depression.  He was awarded 750 dollars a month out of a possible 4,000.

Washington died in Allentown, PA on December 31, 2008, at the age of 62.  He was survived by his four children and three grandchildren.

See also
 List of NCAA major college yearly punt and kickoff return leaders

References

External links
 FitzGerald, Tom "Vic Washington, 49ers Pro Bowler from 1970s dies at 62" San Francisco Chronicle, Saturday, February 7, 2009

1946 births
2008 deaths
American football running backs
American football safeties
Buffalo Bills players
Canadian football running backs
Houston Oilers players
National Conference Pro Bowl players
Ottawa Rough Riders players
Sportspeople from Plainfield, New Jersey
San Francisco 49ers players
Wyoming Cowboys football players
Players of American football from New Jersey